Talk - Action = 0 is the 17th studio album by Canadian punk rock band D.O.A. It was released on June 8, 2010. The title had already appeared as the slogan on the back of their 2002 album Win The Battle.
All songs are written by Joe Keithley except where noted.

Track listing
 That's Why I Am an Atheist
 Rebel Kind
 They Hate Punk Rock
 I Live in a Car
 The R.C.M.P.
 Don't Bank on a Bank
 Tyrants Turn in Hell
 The Times They Are A-Changin' (Bob Dylan)
 Captain Kirk, Spock, Scotty and Bones
 Don't Let Your Life
 That's Amore (Harry Warren/Jack Brooks)
 Lookin' for a World

Personnel

The band
 Floor Tom Jones – drums
 Dirty Dan Sedan – Bass
 Joey Shithead - guitar, vocals

Additional musicians
 Ford Pier – Special guest Singer

References

2010 albums
D.O.A. (band) albums
Sudden Death Records albums